Dimu Dobak is a village in Kamrup district. It is 30.9 km from Guwahati.

Transport
Dimu Dobak is accessible through National Highway 31. All major private commercial vehicles ply between Dimu Dobak and nearby towns.

Education
Tulsibari Boys Higher Secondary School, Sidhi Nath Sarma High School and Sirdartha Sankar High School are few of various schools located in Dimu Dobak.

See also
 Guwakuchi
 Batsor

References

Villages in Kamrup district